Nicholas José Talbot FRS FRSB (born 5 September 1965) is Group Leader and Executive Director at The Sainsbury Laboratory in Norwich.

Education
Talbot was educated at Midhurst Grammar School. He went on to study at the University of Wales, Swansea for a Bachelor of Science degree in Microbiology graduating in 1986. Following his undergraduate degree, he trained at the University of East Anglia (UEA) where he was awarded a PhD in 1990 for genetic and genomic analysis of the leaf mould Cladosporuim fulvum.

Career
After postdoctoral research at Purdue University from 1990 to 1993, Talbot was appointed a Lecturer at the University of Exeter in 1993, and has been Professor of Molecular Genetics since 1999. He was appointed Deputy Vice-Chancellor for Research and Knowledge Transfer in 2010. In 2018 Talbot joined The Sainsbury Laboratory in Norwich as Group Leader and Executive Director.

Research
Talbot's research investigates plant pathology and developmental biology, especially the rice blast fungus Magnaporthe grisea, one of the world's most devastating diseases. Talbot is the editor of Molecular and Cellular Biology of Filamentous Fungi and Plant-Pathogen Interactions.

Talbot's research has been funded by the Biotechnology and Biological Sciences Research Council (BBSRC) and the Engineering and Physical Sciences Research Council (EPSRC). Talbot has twice been awarded prestigious European Research Council (ERC) Advanced Grants in 2013 and 2022. His current ERC grant supports the SEPBLAST project which will build on his research group's recent discoveries on fungal morphogenetic proteins, called septins, being essential for the rice blast pathogen to cause disease.

Awards and honours
Talbot was elected Fellow of the Royal Society of Biology (FRSB) in 2010, a member of the European Molecular Biology Organization in 2013, and a Fellow of the Royal Society in 2014. His nomination reads:

Personal life
Talbot is married to Catherine Ann Walsh, with two sons and one daughter.

References

1965 births
Living people
Alumni of Swansea University
Alumni of the University of East Anglia
Academics of the University of Exeter
Fellows of the Royal Society
Members of the European Molecular Biology Organization
Fellows of the Royal Society of Biology
People educated at Midhurst Grammar School
People from Haslemere